Sensation in Savoy is a 1950 West German comedy crime film directed by Eduard von Borsody and starring Sybille Schmitz, Paul Klinger, and Karl Schönböck.

It was made by Bavaria Film at their Bavaria Studios in Munich. The film's sets were designed by the art director Ernst H. Albrecht.

Cast

References

Bibliography

External links 
 

1950 films
West German films
1950s crime comedy films
1950s German-language films
Films directed by Eduard von Borsody
German crime comedy films
Bavaria Film films
Films with screenplays by Karl Georg Külb
1950 comedy films
German black-and-white films
Films shot at Bavaria Studios
1950s German films